Canarium pseudodecumanum is a tree of tropical Asia in the incense tree family Burseraceae. The specific epithet  is from the Latin meaning "false decumanum", referring to the species' resemblance to Canarium decumanum.

Description
Its grey-white bark is smooth to scaly.

Distribution and habitat
Canarium pseudodecumanum grows naturally in Sumatra, Peninsular Malaysia and Borneo. Its habitat is lowland forests on swamp land from sea-level to  altitude.

Uses
The tree's resin is used in boat construction. The fruit is considered edible. The seeds produce an edible oil.

References

pseudodecumanum
Trees of Sumatra
Trees of Peninsular Malaysia
Trees of Borneo
Taxonomy articles created by Polbot